Astro SuperSport is an English language in-house subscription satellite television network in Malaysia dedicated to broadcasting sports-related content 24 hours a day. It is available on the Astro via Channels 810 & 831 (HD) to subscribers of the Sports package only. Launched in 1996 as one of Astro's original channels, Astro SuperSport offers a variety of international sporting events such as football, badminton, motorsport, rugby, volleyball, golf and WWE shows. Astro SuperSport broadcasts in HD on Channel 831. The network has been broadcasting studio shows around major football in HD like the Premier League and FIFA World Cup since 2010 and magazine shows like FourFourTwo since 2011.

Channels

Astro Box Office Sport 

Astro Box Office Sport is the first pay-per-view channel of Astro. Launched on 2000, it is broadcast on Astro via Channel 200. This channel focuses on the most sporting events live around the world, such as boxing and WWE.

Astro SuperSport Plus 
Astro SuperSport Plus was the extra channel of Astro SuperSport. It is broadcast on Astro in HD.

Astro SuperSport 2 
Astro SuperSport 2 is the second sister channel of Astro SuperSport. Launched on 18 November 2009, it is broadcast on Astro via Channel 811 and in high-definition Channel 833. Sporting events that are aired on this network events include the BWF Super Series, the ATP World Tour Finals, the J-League, the Bundesliga, the Ligue 1 as well as American competitions like NFL and NHL and Mexican competitions like Copa MX.

Astro SuperSport 3
Astro SuperSport 3 is the third sister channel of Astro SuperSport. Launched on 1 July 2010, it is broadcast on Astro via Channel 816 and in high-definition Channel 834.

Astro SuperSport 4
Astro SuperSport 4 is the forth sister channel of Astro SuperSport. Launched on 23 April 2013, it is broadcast on Astro via Channel 817 in SD. HD version is available via channel 836. It simulcasts games such as FA Cup, NBA Games,  WNBA, Badminton Premier, Superseries and Grand Prix Gold, WTA Tour plus pulsating shows of WWE such as WWE Raw, WWE Smackdown, WWE NXT, WWE This Week and WWE Bottomline.

eGG Network
eGG (every Good Game) is the first 24/7 eSports, Gaming Entertainment Network in Southeast Asia  and is the gaming channel Of Astro Supersport. Launched on 13 August 2015 as the Astro SuperSport Plus, previously this channel only available in Malaysia as the special sister channel of Astro SuperSport but due to high enthusiasm of eSports fans outside Malaysia, from 7 June 2016, the channel changed its name and was launched officially as eGG. After the eGG Network launched in 2016, the channel is also available for the viewers in Australia, Indonesia, Myanmar, Philippines, Singapore, and Thailand. This channel focuses on e-sports, and broadcasts electronic games tournaments live around the world. The first tournament broadcast through this channel was The International 2015.

Astro SuperSport 5 
Astro SuperSport 5 is the fifth sister channel of Astro SuperSport. Launched on 1 October 2021, it is broadcast on Astro via Channel 815. It airs world class sporting events that were on Fox Sports (which is set to cease its operations also on the same date) such as UFC, Bundesliga, Formula 1, BWF Badminton, AFC Football, ATP Tennis and more. Astro SuperSport 5 also airs SPOTV2 programming.

Coverage

Current

Broadcasting rights

Football

Futsal and Beach Soccer 
 FIFA
 National teams
 Men's :
 FIFA Arab Cup
 FIFA World Cup (including qualifiers for Europe (all matches) and Asia (selected matches)
 FIFA U-20 World Cup
 FIFA U-17 World Cup
 FIFA Beach Soccer World Cup
 FIFA Futsal World Cup
 Women's :
 FIFA Women's World Cup
 FIFA U-20 Women's World Cup
 FIFA U-17 Women's World Cup
 International Friendly
 UEFA
 UEFA European Championship (including qualifiers)
 UEFA Nations League
 CONMEBOL–UEFA
 CONMEBOL–UEFA Cup of Champions
 AFC
 AFC Asian Cup
 AFC Champions League
 Kirin Cup Soccer
 Saudi Professional League
 English Premier League 
 DFL (no broadcast since 2015 until 2020)
 Bundesliga
 Super Cup
 Eredivisie 
 La Liga
 Primeira Liga
 FA
 Cup
 Community Shield
 DFB-Pokal: coverage starts from round of 16

Badminton 
 BWF
 BWF World Tour
 World Championships
 Teams
 Thomas Cup (men's championship)
 Uber Cup (women's championship)
 Sudirman Cup (mixed team championship)
 Individuals
Badminton Asia Championships (national teams (men's, women's, and mixed) and Individuals)
Malaysia Purple League

Basketball 
 ASEAN Basketball League 
 NBA

Hockey 
 FIH
Men :
Men's FIH Hockey World Cup World Cups (including qualifiers for senior teams)
Men's FIH Pro League
FIH Junior World Cup 
Women's :
Women's FIH Hockey World Cup
Women's FIH Junior World Cup World Cups (including qualifiers for senior teams)
Women's FIH Pro League 
 Asia Hockey
Men :
Men's Hockey Asia Cup 
Women :
Women's Hockey Asia Cup

Table tennis 
 ITTF

Fight Sports

Boxing 
 TBA

Wrestling 
 WWE
 Raw
 SmackDown!

Mixed martial arts 
 ONE Championship 
 UFC

Multi-sport events 
 Commonwealth Games
 Summer Olympic Games
 Winter Olympic Games
 Asian Games

Former

Broadcasting rights

Football

Futsal and Beach Soccer 
 FIFA
 FIFA Confederations Cup (until 2017, now the tournament abolished)
 FIFA Club World Cup (until 2022)
 UEFA
 National teams
 UEFA European Under-21 Championship (until 2017)
 UEFA Futsal Championship (until 2016)
 Copa América (until 2021)
 Clubs (until 2018–19)
UEFA Champions League
 UEFA Europa League
 UEFA Super Cup (until 2017)
 2015 AFC Women's Futsal Championship
 EFL (until 2015–16, except for EFL Cup until 2018–19)
 Cup
 Championship
 League One
 EFL League Two
 J-League (until 2022)
 K-League (until 2022)
 International Champions Cup (until 2019)
 RFEF (until 2016 Supercopa)
 Copa del Rey
 Supercopa
 Lega Serie A (until 2012–13, except for Serie A until 2014–15)
 Serie A
 Coppa Italia
 Supercoppa Italiana
 CONMEBOL
 Copa America (until 2021)

Motorsport 
 Formula One (until 2022)

References

See also

 Astro
 Astro Arena

Sports television in Malaysia
Astro Malaysia Holdings television channels
Television channels and stations established in 1996